Design theory is a subfield of design research concerned with various theoretical approaches towards understanding and delineating design principles, design knowledge, and design practice.

History 

Design theory has been approached and interpreted in many ways, from designers' personal statements of design principles, through constructs of the philosophy of design to a search for a design science.

The essay "Ornament and Crime" by Adolf Loos from 1908 is one of the early 'principles' design-theoretical texts. Others include Le Corbusier's Vers une architecture (1923),<ref name="Corbusier 1923">Le Corbusier, Vers une architecture" (1923)</ref> and Victor Papanek's Design for the real world (1972).

In a 'principles' approach to design theory, the De Stijl movement (founded in 1917) promoted a geometrical abstract, "ascetic" form of purism that was limited to functionality. This modernist attitude underpinned the Bauhaus movement (1919 onwards). Principles were drawn up for design that were applicable to all areas of modern aesthetics.

For an introduction to the philosophy of design see the article by Per Galle at the Royal Danish Academy.

An example of early design science was  Altshuller's Theory of inventive problem solving, known as TRIZ, which originated in the Soviet Union in the 1940s.  Herbert Simon's 1969 The sciences of the artificial developed further foundations for a science of design. Since then the further development of fields such as design methods, design research, design science, design studies and design thinking has promoted a wider understanding of design theory.

 See also 
 Design history
 Design research
 Design science

References

 Sources 
 Adolf Loos, Ornament and Crime, 1908
 Walter Gropius, The capacity of the Bauhaus idea, 1922
 Raymond Loewy, The Mayan threshold, 1951
 Roland Barthes, Mythologies, 1957, Frankfurt am Main, Suhrkamp, 2003 (in 1964)  [Excerpt from: Mythologies, 1957]
 Tomás Maldonado, New developments in the industry, 1958
 Marshall McLuhan, The medium is the message, 1964
 Abraham Moles, The crisis of functionalism, 1968
 Herbert A. Simon, The Science of Design, 1969
 Horst Rittel, Dilemmas in a general theory of planning, 1973
 Lucius Burckhardt, design is invisible, 1980
 Annika Frye, Design und Improvisation: Produkte, Prozesse und Methoden, transcript, Bielefeld, 2017 
 Maurizio Vitta, The Meaning of Design, 1985
 Andrea Branzi, We are the primitives, 1985
 Dieter Rams, Ramsifikation, 1987
 Maurizio Morgantini, Man Confronted by the Third Technological Generation, 1989
 Otl Aicher, Bauhaus and Ulm, 1991
 Gui Bonsiepe, On Some virtues of Design
 Claudia Mareis, design as a knowledge culture, 2011
 Bruce Sterling,today Tomorrow composts, 2005
 Tony Fry, Design Beyond the Limits, 2011
 Tom Bieling, Design (&) Activism – Perspectives on Design as Activism and Activism as Design. Mimesis, Milano, 2019, ISBN 978-88-6977-241-2
 Nigel Cross, design thinking, Berg, Oxford, 2011 
 Victor Margolin, The Politics of the Artificial: Essays on Design and Design Studies, 2002
 Yana Milev, D.A.: A Transdisciplinary Handbook of Design Anthropology'', 2013
 Michael Schulze, concept and concept of the work. The sculptural design in architectural education, Zurich vdf, Hochschulverlag AG at the ETH Zurich, 2013, 
 Dieter Pfister, Atmospheric style. On the importance of atmosphere and design for a socially sustainable interior design, Basel, 2013, 
 Tim Parsons, Thinking: Objects, Contemporary Approaches to Product Design (AVA Academia Advanced), Juli 2009,

External links 
 http://backspace.com/notes/2009/07/design-manifestos.php

Design
Design history
Culture